Alfred Kotey (3 June 1968 – 30 June 2020) was a Ghanaian professional boxer who competed from 1988 to 2012. He held the WBO bantamweight title from 1994 to 1995 and at regional level the Commonwealth flyweight title from 1989 to 1990. As an amateur he represented Ghana at the 1988 Summer Olympics.

Kotey died on 30 June 2020 in New York City where he was receiving medical treatment for a stroke and other complications.

Amateur career
Kotey represented Ghana as a flyweight at the 1988 Olympic Games. His results were:
1st round bye
Defeated Hussain al-Mutairi (Kuwait) RSC 1
Defeated Benjamin Mwangata (Tanzania) 5-0
Lost to Mario González (Mexico) 0-5

Professional career 
After his victory over Puerto Rico's Rafael Del Valle, he won the WBO bantamweight world title and became Ghana's fifth world champion. This was in 1994 at York Hall in London.

References

External links

 Alfred Kotey Interview eastsideboxing.com

1968 births
2020 deaths
Boxers from Accra
Flyweight boxers
Bantamweight boxers
World Boxing Organization champions
World bantamweight boxing champions
Boxers at the 1988 Summer Olympics
Olympic boxers of Ghana
Ghanaian male boxers